is a private university in Takarazuka, Hyōgo, Japan. The predecessor of the school was founded in 1941, and it was chartered as a university in 1967.

External links
 Official website 

Educational institutions established in 1941
Private universities and colleges in Japan
Universities and colleges in Hyōgo Prefecture
1941 establishments in Japan
Takarazuka, Hyōgo